Ali Targholizadeh (Persian:علی تارقلی زاده) (born June 17, 1962) is an Iranian professional futsal director, Asian Football Confederation's head of technical and Futsal department, and former clubs president in the leagues of Football Federation Islamic Republic of Iran as well as former FIFA and AFC, football and futsal instructor. For over 15 years, Targholizadeh has played in many Iranian football clubs such as Taj F.C. (Persian:تاج), which is known as Esteghlal F.C. today, Bank Melli F.C. (Persian:بانک ملی), Karegaran F.C. (Persian:کارگران), Mazda F.C. (Persian:مزدا), Keshavarz F.C. (Persian:کشاورز) and Saazmaneh Goosht F.C. (Persian:سازمان گوشت). In his early life in Iran, he has also managed teams such as Kosar F.C. (Persian:کوثر), Azerbaijan F.C. (Persian:آذربایجان) and  Keshavarz F.C. (Persian:کشاورز). Targholizadeh has been a member of Asian Football Confederation since 2004 and is known as one of the oldest associates in the Asian House in Kuala Lumpur, Malaysia.

Early life

Ali Targholizadeh was born on June 17, 1962 in Baharloo Hospital (Persian:بيمارستان بهارلو) in Tehran, Iran. He is the second youngest child of Ozra Jak and Baba Targholizadeh, who was an owner of a factory, retail store and a mechanic workshop. His family consists of him, two brothers and six elder sisters. He began elementary school in Shahpour Gholamreza Elementary School in 1969. Besides education, Targholizadeh focused mainly on sports such as Football and Volleyball. He also began to work alongside his father and brothers in their family owned factory and retail store at the age of 17. After completing Elementary school in Shahpour Gholamreza, he moved to Shahaab Secondary School in Tehran, where he continued his education. He then entered Sanati 10 Technicom High School, where he studied Architecture, till he graduated in 1979. Targholizadeh was not able to advance to a university after his high school graduation, due to the Iranian Revolution in 1979, where all the schools and universities were shut down till 1981. He finally managed to enter The University of Tehran after the schools and education facilities recommenced. His major was Religious Studies in The University of Tehran, which he quit after barely a year, due to the lack of interest in the field. That was when he moved to Islamic Azad University of Tehran where he studied Physical education in 1981. He graduated in 1984 and continued to work.

Club career

Targholizadeh made his football debut in Taj F.C. Grass-root Soccer school U14 in the Autumn of 1974 under the late manager Ali Danaeifard (Persian:علی دانعی فرد) where he spent three years, playing his very first official games of his life. He then moved to Bank Melli F.C. youth U16 team in 1977. After spending one year at the club, Targholizadeh joined Karegaran F.C. In 1979, where he spent another year. In 1981, Targholizadeh signed a contract with Mazda F.C.. He gradually gained a stable position in the club and decided to stay for six years. In 1987, he left Mazda F.C to join Saazmaneh Goosht F.C.. He spent 4 years playing for Saazmaneh Goosht F.C. which later converted its name to Keshavarz F.C.

Coaching career

Besides playing for Mazda F.C. from 1981–86, Targholizadeh simultaneously coached for the club's youth team from 1982-86. In 1988, he coached both youth and senior teams of Saazmaneh Goosht F.C.. In 1993, he accepted the job at Mehr Karaj F.C. which is called Saipa F.C. today and managed the club until 1995. He coached for Entezameh Rey F.C. of Tehran, from 1996-97. In late 1998, Targholizadeh left Entezameh Rey F.C. to manage Kosar F.C. on a one-year contract. Finally, his final coaching years was with Shohadaye Tarasht F.C. which was from 2002–04.

Personal life

Ali Targholizadeh practiced Islam since he was born. His parents were devout Muslims, just like the majority of the Iranian population after the Iranian Revolution. He has one elder and one younger brother, alongside six elder sisters, of which one has passed away. He married Maryam Eftekhari on August 20, 1990 in Tehran, Iran. He currently has four children, Mohsen, Mohammad, Majid and Hamidreza. Targholizadeh and his family moved to Malaysia in 2004, after he received an offer from the Asian Football Confederation in Kuala Lumpur.

Life In AFC
Ali Targholizadeh moved to Malaysia and began work in The Deputy Of Technical Division in Asian Football Confederation in late 2004. He had the same role in the Asian Football for three years.
In the beginning of 2007, Targholizadeh was promoted to the position of Asian Football Confederation's Director Of Futsal. Since 2007, Targholizadeh has been directing AFC Futsal Championship Tournaments which has been held in various Asian countries.

References

1962 births
Living people
Asian Football Confederation officials
Association football executives
Esteghlal F.C. players
Iranian football managers
Iranian footballers
Keshavarz players
Association football midfielders